Theodor S. Slen (October 15, 1885 – July 4, 1986) was an American educator, lawyer, and politician.

Slen was born in Delavan, Faribault County, Minnesota. He moved with his family in 1898 to a farm near Boyd, Minnesota. Slen graduated from Boyd High School in Boyd, Minnesota and then graduated from the  Madison Lutheran Normal School in 1906. He received his bachelor's degree from St. Olaf College in 1912 and his law degree from University of Minnesota Law School in 1915. Slen was admitted to the Minnesota bar in 1915. He lived with his wife and family in Madison, Lac du Parle County, Minnesota and practiced law. He served in the Minnesota National Guard during the Mexican Border Conflict and World War I. Slen served as a probate judge and attorney for Madison, Minnesota and as the Lac du Parle County Attorney. Slen served in the Minnesota House of Representatives from 1935 to 1940 and was an Independent and was a Democrat. Slen died at the Madison Lutheran Home in Madison, Minnesota from pneumonia.

References

1885 births
1986 deaths
American centenarians
Men centenarians
People from Faribault County, Minnesota
People from Madison, Minnesota
Minnesota National Guard personnel
St. Olaf College alumni
University of Minnesota Law School alumni
Minnesota lawyers
Minnesota state court judges
Members of the Minnesota House of Representatives